This is a list of seasons competed by the Toronto Argonauts, a Canadian Football League team.  While the team was founded in 1873, they did not join the Interprovincial Rugby Football Union until it was founded in 1907.  The IRFU ultimately merged with the Western Interprovincial Football Union and formed the CFL in 1958, which the Argos have been competing in ever since.  Throughout their history, the Argos have won 17 Grey Cups (including 10 before the CFL was formed), more than any other team.

Notes

References

Toronto Argonauts seasons
Toronto Argonauts lists